Halle Cioffi was the defending champion but lost in the second round to Gretchen Magers.

Katerina Maleeva won in the final 6–3, 2–6, 6–2 against Zina Garrison.

Seeds
A champion seed is indicated in bold text while text in italics indicates the round in which that seed was eliminated.

  Zina Garrison (final)
  Katerina Maleeva (champion)
  Stephanie Rehe (semifinals)
  Larisa Savchenko (second round)
  Helen Kelesi (first round)
  Anne Minter (first round)
  Halle Cioffi (second round)
  Leila Meskhi (first round)

Draw

References
 1988 Virginia Slims of Indianapolis Draw

Virginia Slims of Indianapolis
1988 WTA Tour